Bingham Peak is a sharp peak,  high, located  southeast of Springer Peak in the Heritage Range, Ellsworth Mountains. It was mapped by the United States Geological Survey from ground surveys and from U.S. Navy air photos, 1961–66, and named by the Advisory Committee on Antarctic Names for Joseph P. Bingham, an auroral scientist at Eights Station in 1965.

See also
 Mountains in Antarctica

References 

Ellsworth Mountains
Mountains of Ellsworth Land